Tukabatchee or Tuckabutche (Creek: Tokepahce ) is one of the four mother towns of the Muscogee Creek confederacy. The pre-removal tribal town was located on the Tallapoosa River in the present-day state of Alabama.

The town is believed to be the first site of the ancient 'busk' fire which began the Green Corn Ceremony. Tukabatchee was the home of Big Warrior, one of the two principal chiefs of the Creeks until his death in 1826. Chief Opothleyahola was born here in 1780.

In 1811 Tecumseh and Tenskwatawa (better known as the Prophet) addressed Creek leaders in the Tukabatchee town square. Tecumseh was so disappointed in Big Warrior's response at the end of his speech against American expansion that he said upon reaching Chalagawtha the Prophet would  "...stamp his foot and all of Tuckabatchee's cabins would fall."  The town was leveled by the New Madrid earthquake a month later.

During the Creek War in 1813, Red Stick rebels surrounded the town. The siege was lifted by Creeks from the nearby town of Cusseta.

Notes

Muscogee tribal towns